Montepila is a white Spanish wine grape. It is one of the authorized varieties in the Montilla-Moriles Denominación de Origen (DO), in Andalusia, Spain.

Montepila is not known under any other synonyms.

References

White wine grape varieties